Robert Lake is a freshwater body of the southeastern part of the Eeyou Istchee James Bay (municipality), in Jamésie, in the administrative region of Nord-du-Québec, in the province of Quebec, in Canada.

This body of water extends in the townships of Feuquières and Robert. Forestry is the main economic activity of the sector. Recreational tourism activities come second.

The Lake Robert hydrographic slope is accessible via the R1032 forest road (North-South direction) that passes on the west side of the lake. Lake Robert's surface is usually frozen from early November to mid-May, however, safe ice circulation is generally from mid-November to mid-April.

Geography

Toponymy
The term "Robert" is a first name and family name of French origin.

The toponym "lac Robert" was officialized on December 5, 1968 by the Commission de toponymie du Québec, when it was created.

Notes and references

See also 

Eeyou Istchee James Bay
Lakes of Nord-du-Québec
Nottaway River drainage basin